ISO 3166-2:MK is the entry for North Macedonia in ISO 3166-2, part of the ISO 3166 standard published by the International Organization for Standardization (ISO), which defines codes for the names of the principal subdivisions (e.g., provinces or states) of all countries coded in ISO 3166-1.

Currently for North Macedonia, ISO 3166-2 codes are defined for 80 municipalities.

Each code consists of two parts, separated by a hyphen. The second part is 3 digits.

Current codes
Subdivision names are listed as in the ISO 3166-2 standard published by the ISO 3166 Maintenance Agency (ISO 3166/MA).

Subdivision names are sorted in Macedonian alphabetical order after romanization (different from the original Cyrillic order used to assign codes): a-c, č, d-s, š, t-z, ž.

Click on the button in the header to sort each column.

Changes
The following changes to the entry have been announced in newsletters by the ISO 3166/MA since the first publication of ISO 3166-2 in 1998. ISO stopped issuing newsletters in 2013.

The following changes to the entry are listed on ISO's online catalogue, the Online Browsing Platform:

Codes changed in Newsletter I-9

Codes deleted on 27 November 2015

See also
 Subdivisions of Macedonia
 FIPS region codes of Macedonia
 NUTS codes of Macedonia

External links
 ISO Online Browsing Platform: MK
 Municipalities of Macedonia, Statoids.com

2:MK
ISO 3166-2
North Macedonia geography-related lists